John D. Johnson is an American academic and politician who is a member of the Utah State Senate from the 3rd district. Elected in November 2020, he assumed office on January 1, 2021. He represented the 19th district between 2021-2023 prior to redistricting.

Early life and education 
A native of Weber County, Utah, Johnson graduated from Weber High School in 1977. He earned a Bachelor of Arts degree in economics from Weber State University and a PhD in economics from Texas A&M University.

Career 
In 1986 and 1987, Johnson was a visiting professor of economics at Southern Methodist University. From 1987 to 2000, he was an associate professor at the University of Mississippi. Johnson became a professor and chair of the management and information systems department at the Jon M. Huntsman School of Business in 2006. 

Johnson has founded several companies. 

Johnson was elected to the Utah Senate in November 2020, defeating Democratic nominee Katy Owens. During the campaign, Johnson characterized himself as a "Reagan Republican".

References 

Living people
Year of birth missing (living people)
American economists
Weber State University alumni
Texas A&M University alumni
Southern Methodist University faculty
University of Mississippi faculty
Utah State University faculty
Republican Party Utah state senators
People from North Ogden, Utah
People from Weber County, Utah